Edward Holland may refer to:

Edward Holland (mayor) (1702–1756), mayor of New York, 1747–1757
Edward Holland (MP) (1806–1875), British Member of Parliament for East Worcestershire and Evesham
Edward Holland (priest) (1838–1918), Irish priest and writer
Edward Holland (bishop) (born 1936), English bishop, former Suffragan Bishop in Europe
Eddie Holland (Edward Holland, Jr., born 1939), American singer, part of Motown's Holland-Dozier-Holland songwriting team
Edward Everett Holland (1861–1941), American politician, U.S. Representative from Virginia
Edward J. Holland, governor of Madras (see Avadhanum Paupiah)
Edward James Gibson Holland (1878–1948), Canadian soldier, recipient of Victoria Cross
Edward M. Holland (born 1939), attorney and member of the Virginia Senate, 1972–1996
Ed Holland (1918–2009), American editorial cartoonist
Edward F. Holland (1931 or 1932-2015), American politician, member of the Rhode Island Senate